Travis Ortmayer (born August 9, 1981) is an American professional Strongman athlete from Cypress, Texas. He is nicknamed the Texas Stoneman due to his many world records in the Atlas Stone event.

Ortmayer's strongman training complex is called "The Unit". His father, Roger Ortmayer, trains with him.  He is supported by his mother, Sonja Ortmayer and his sister, Tara Ortmayer.  Travis Ortmayer was born in Lake Tahoe, Nevada.

Strength Sports
Ortmayer started out training in bodybuilding in his early teens and eventually decided to train and compete in powerlifting.  He met Marshall White, who introduced him to the Strongman sport.  In 2002, Marshall and Ortmayer formed "the Unit" strongman training grounds in Cypress, Texas. "The Unit" was also joined by World's Strongest Man competitor Josh Thigpen and professional strongman Jim Glassman. Ortmayer earned his American Strongman Corporation (ASC) Professional Strongman card by winning the 2004 NAS US Amateur National Championships.

The International Federation of Strength Athletes (IFSA) split from the TWI (Trans World International) World's Strongest Man (WSM) contest in 2005. IFSA held the first and only Pan-American Championship in 2005 at São Paulo, Brazil, as a qualifier for the 2005 IFSA Strongman World Championships. Ortmayer competed in this qualifier and placed 2nd overall behind 2006 WSM winner Phil Pfister. Ortmayer also set a World Record for the Atlas Stones: Light Set strength event.  His placement qualified him to compete in the inaugural 2005 IFSA Strongman World Championships being held in Quebec City, Canada. During the World Championship, Ortmayer set another World Record in the Atlas Stones, this time with the Heavy Set. Ortmayer ultimately placed 10th overall in the World Championships.

In 2006 Ortmayer eventually won his first international competition in Cyprus at the IFSA Cyprus Grand Prix. This was one week after attaining a pectoralis injury at the 2006 World Strongman Challenge in Tulsa, Oklahoma. Ortmayer went on to win all three National Championship Qualifiers.

At the 2006 America's Strongest Man, Ortmayer was 1.5 points away from victory, but took home 3rd place overall. His performance, however, earned him an invite  by strength sport historian Terry Todd to compete in his contest, the Arnold Strongman Classic contest, 2007, in Columbus, Ohio.  Ortmayer also qualified to compete in the 2006 IFSA World Championship being held in Reykjavík, Iceland.

Ortmayer suffered a shoulder injury, and lost 25 lbs. He competed in the 2006 IFSA World Championships.  He maintained his Atlas Stone: Light Set world record, but lost his Heavy Set world record to the 2006 Champion Žydrūnas Savickas.  Ortmayer placed 10th overall.

Ortmayer then went on to compete in the exclusive 2007 Arnold Strongman Classic competition. During the Timber Frame Carry, he injured his right foot; the timber frame dropped on his foot when his heel made contact with the apparatus. During the Hummer Tire Deadlift, Ortmayer also injured his back, and was waived out of the competition by the attending doctor.  Ortmayer did come back to compete in the final event, the Circus Dumbbell press, but was unable to complete the event due to his previous injuries.  He placed 10th overall.

Ortmayer went on to compete in the 2007 Fresno Pro-Am (USA National Championship Qualifier).  He won this contest, which qualified him to compete in the 2007 America's Strongest Man (USA National Championship).  During the USA National Championship, Ortmayer re-injured his back on the second event, the Tire Deadlift, and pulled out of the competition.

Ortmayer has since gone on to compete in two team contests.  The USA vs. World contest put on by Al Thompson in June 2007 in Philadelphia, USA was his first.  Ortmayer and his team (Derek Poundstone, Van Hatfield, Nick Best and Walt Gogola) pulled out a victory against the three of the top five European strongmen in the World, (Žydrūnas Savickas, Vasyl Virastyuk and Andrus Murumets.  The contest was a tie going into the final event, the Atlas Stones.  Team USA pulled out a victory in Ortmayer's signature event to capture the win overall.  His next team contest was the World's Strongest Nation, held in Ukraine in August 2007.  This time Team USA consisted of Ortmayer along with Derek Poundstone, Tom McClure and Brian Shaw. Team USA placed 2nd overall.

Ortmayer competed in the 2007 IFSA Strongamn World Championships in Geumsan, South Korea.  The qualifying heats consisted of four events, and the top two from each heat of four athletes would go on to the finals.  Ortmayer finished third overall in his heat and failed to qualify for the finals.

Ortmayer and his father Roger Ortmayer opened the elite personal training gym Athletic Nation in 2007.  Ortmayer worked the microphone at the Arnold Strongman contest in March 2008.

Ortmayer took some time during late 2007 to let his body recover and to build up base strength levels.  He achieved his goal of an 800 lb deadlift on December 1, 2007, in a powerlifting meet.  Since then he has gone on to win every contest he has competed in, as of March 15, 2008.  In doing so, he has qualified for the World's Strongest Man Super Series 2008 and America's Strongest Man 2008.  Ortmayer was invited to compete in the Fortissimus – Decathlon of Strength competition held in Canada the last weekend of June.

Ortmayer competed in the Strongman Champions League 2008 Latvia contest and finished a close second behind Žydrūnas Savickas.  He beat out champion competitors including Mikhail Koklyaev, Andrus Murumets, and Oleksandr Pekanov.

On April 2, 2008, Ortmayer signed on to compete against Derek Poundstone at the Madison Square Garden Super Series on June 21, 2008. He won the Madison Square Garden Super Series by defeating Derek Poundstone into second place.

Ortmayer competed in the 2008 World's Strongest Man competition, his first time in the contest.  During the qualifiers, Ortmayer took first overall in his qualifying group. Ortmayer still finished in fifth place overall in the finals. Ortmayer would go on to finish fifth at both the 2009 World's Strongest Man and 2010 World's Strongest Man contests in the finals. Ortmayer suffered an injury during the qualifying heats of the 2011 World's Strongest Man contest, was forced to withdraw from the contest, and did not make the finals.

In 2021 Ortmayer returned to World's Strongest Man competition.

Personal records – Strongman (Arnold Classic) (WSM/SS) (IFSA) 
Atlas ("Manhood") Stone 
 240 kg {529 lb 21.5" diameter to 48"} {2009 Arnold Strongman Classic, Columbus, Ohio}
 243.5 kg {535 lb 21.5" diameter to 48" for 3 reps} {2010 Arnold Strongman Classic, Columbus, Ohio}
Ring of Stones: Light Set
 25.5 Sec World Record (2005 Pan Am Championships, São Paulo, Brazil *broken – see below
 19.20 Sec World Record (2006 IFSA World Championships, Iceland)
5 Stone Series
 Heaviest set ever – 275, 308, 330, 407, 474 lbs in 26.18 sec (May, 2009 Mohegan Sun) Connecticut, USA *broken – see below
 Heaviest set ever – 265, 315, 385, 435, 480 lbs in 34.81 sec (August, 2009 Paragon Casino) Baton Rouge, Louisiana
 12.8 Sec 114–182 kg {250–400 lb} Unofficial World Record (Cypress, Texas)
Overhead Log Press
 137 kg * 13 reps (300 lb) All American Challenge (Fit Expo) (Los Angeles)
Timber Carry 
 393 kg {865 lb – 19.94 sec up 36' ramp} American record, {Arnold's Strongest Man, Columbus, Ohio}
SUV Deadlift 
 555 kg * 3 reps {1200+ lb} (USA National Championship Qualifier, South Carolina, United States)

Personal records – powerlifting (USAPL)
Squat
 341 kg {752 lb} – December 1, 2007, Cypress, Texas
Bench Press
 215 kg {474 lb} – December 1, 2007, Cypress, Texas
Deadlift
 364 kg {802 lb} – December 1, 2007, Cypress, Texas
 366 kg * 2 reps {804.5 lb} – April 19, 2008, Ronnie Coleman Classic, Arlington, Texas}
 395 kg {870 lb} – June 21, 2008, Madison Square Garden Super Series, New York City
Total
 921 kg {2030 lb} – December 1, 2007, Cypress, Texas

Achievements
Professional competitive record – 1st (13), 2nd (6), 3rd (8) – out of total (39)
Performance metric – .909  [American – .943, International – .875]

Completed contests

 Strongman Champions League – Serbia – Serbia – 2nd place (7/14/2018)
 America's Strongest Man (USA National Championship) Morgantown, West Virginia USA – 2nd place (7/25-26/2009
 Fortissimus – Louis Cyr Strength Challenge -Montmagny, Quebec, Canada – 4th place (6/27-28/2009
 Viking Power Challenge (Giants Live WSM Qualifier) – Stavanger, Norway – Winner (6/6/2009)
 Mohegan Sun Grand Prix (Giants Live WSM Qualifier) – Uncasville, Connecticut, USA – 2nd place (5/17/2009)
 Strongman Champions League – Serbia – Subotica, Serbia – 2nd place (tie) (5/9/2009)
 FIBO Strongman Classic – Essen, Germany – Winner (4/25/2009)
 American Strongman – Show of Champions –  – Orlando, Florida, USA – Winner (4/17-18/2009)
 Arnold's Strongest Man – Columbus, Ohio, USA – 3rd place (3/6-7/2009)
 All American Strongman Challenge / Fit Expo  (World's Strongest Man Super Series Qualifier) – Los Angeles, California, USA – 3rd place (1/24-25/2009)
 World's Strongest Man – Charleston, West Virginia, USA – 5th place (9/12-14/2008)
 World's Strongest Man Qualifying Round – Charleston, West Virginia, USA – Winner group 5 (9/9/2008)
 World's Strongest Nation Team Competition – Crimea, Ukraine – 4th place (8/6-8/2008)
 Fortissimus – Louis Cyr Strength Challenge – Notre-Dame-Du-Rosaire, Quebec, Canada – 5th place (6/28-29/2008)
 Madison Square Garden Super Series (World's Strongest Man Qualifier) – New York, USA – Winner (6/21/2008)
 Strongman Champions League – Holland – Varsseveld, Holland – 3rd place (6/1/2008)
 Strongman Champions League – Latvia – Riga, Latvia – 2nd place (3/22/2008)
 St. Patrick's Strongman (USA National Championship Qualifier) – Columbia, South Carolina, USA – Winner (3/15/2008)
 Nutrition Depot Strongman Expo – Cypress, Texas, USA – Winner (3/8/2008)
 All American Challenge / Fit Expo  (World's Strongest Man Super Series Qualifier) – Los Angeles, California, USA – Winner (2/17/2008)
 IFSA World Championships-Qualifiers – Geumsan, South Korea – 3rd in heat (9/12/2007)
 IFSA World Open Championship – Geumsan, South Korea – Winner (9/10/2007)
 World's Strongest Nation Team Competition – Ukraine – 2nd place (8/6/2007)
 USA vs. World Team Competition  – Philadelphia, Pennsylvania, USA – Winner (7/1/2007)
 America's Strongest Man (USA National Championship) – Charlotte, North Carolina, USA – injured (5/26/2007)
 Clovis/Fresno Pro-Am (USA National Championship Qualifier) – Fresno, California, USA – Winner (4/21/2007)
 Arnold's Strongest Man – Columbus, Ohio, USA – 10th place (3/4/2007)
 Ukraine Strongman Contest – Ukraine – 6th place (2006)
 IFSA World Championship – Reykjavik, Iceland – 10th place (11/25/2006)
 USA vs. Lithuania Team Competition – Lithuania – 2nd place (10/20/2006)
 Lithuania Grand Prix – Marijampole, Lithuania – 8th place (8/19/2006)
 World's Strongest Nation Team Competition – Kiev, Ukraine – 3rd place (8/3/2006)
 America's Strongest Man (USA National Championship) – Charlotte, North Carolina, USA – 3rd place (7/22/2006)
 Liberty City Strongman Classic (USA Nationals Qualifier) – Philadelphia, Pennsylvania, USA – Winner (7/1/2006)
 Utah's Strongest Man (USA National Championship Qualifier) – Utah, USA – Winner (6/10/2006)
 Hungary Grand Prix – Eger, Hungary – 3rd place (6/5/2006)
 Cyprus Grand Prix – Island of Cyprus – Winner (5/28/2006)
 World Strongman Challenge (USA Grand Prix) – Tulsa, Oklahoma, USA – injured (5/21/2006)
 Dubai Grand Prix – Dubai, United Arab Emirates – 4th place (4/25/2006)
 St. Patrick's Strongman (USA National Championship Qualifier) – Columbia, South Carolina, USA – Winner (3/18/2006)
 Iron Man Fit Expo Strongman Championship – Pasadena, California, USA – Winner (2/19/2006)
 IFSA World Team Championships – St. Maarten Island – 2nd place (12/10/2005)
 World's Strongest Nation Team Competition – Sevestopol, Ukraine – 3rd place (10/21/2005)
 IFSA World Championship – Quebec, Canada – 10th place (9/24/2005)
 Pan-American Championship – São Paulo, Brazil – 2nd place (8/20/2005)
 Utah's Strongest Man – Mapleton, Utah, USA – Winner (7/23/2005)
 Liberty City Strongman Classic – Philadelphia, Pennsylvania, USA 3rd place (7/2/2005)
 Hawaii's Strongest Man – Honolulu, Hawaii, USA – 3rd place (4/17/2005)
 Kansas City Pro-Am – Kansas City, Missouri, USA – Winner (2/26/2005)
 The Fit Expo Strongman Championship – Pasadena, California, USA – 2nd place (2/19/2005)

Amateur competitive record – 1st (7), 2nd (1), 3rd (2) – out of total (12)]
Performance metric – .941

 USA Amateur National Championship – Heavyweight Division (NAS) (Amateur Platinum Plus Level Competition) – winner (10/10/2004) earned ASC Professional Strongman Card
 Midwest Open (Amateur Platinum Level Competition) – Missouri, USA – 1st place tie (7/31/2004)
 Strongman Record Breakers (Amateur Platinum Level Competition) – Illinois, USA – winner (7/03/2004)
 Music City Strongman (Amateur Platinum Level Competition) – Tennessee, USA – winner (6/12/2004)
 Show Me Pro-Am (Amateur Platinum Plus Level Competition) – St. Louis, Missouri, USA – 3rd place (5/08/2004)
 Monster's of the Midwest (Amateur Platinum Level Competition) – Missouri, USA – 3rd place (12/6/2003)
 USA Amateur National Championship – HW Division (Amateur Platinum Level Competition) – 12th place (10/4/2003)
 South Carolina's Strongest Man (Amateur Gold Level Competition) – South Carolina, USA – winner (8/16/2003)
 Texas's Strongest Man (Amateur Gold Level Competition) – Texas, USA – winner (7/12/2003)
 Texas's Summer Strongman (Amateur Gold Level Competition) – Texas, USA – 2nd place tie (5/10/2003)
 Pure Power Strongman Contest (Amateur Gold Level Competition) – winner (4/26/2003)
 Texas's Strongest Man (Amateur Gold Level Competition) – Texas, USA – 5th place (8/03/2002)

References

External links

 Official IFSA Professional Strongman Profile of Travis Ortmayer
 Travis Ortmayer interview courtesy of Mike Westerling

American powerlifters
1981 births
Living people
American strength athletes
People from Cypress, Texas